Charles Melvin Jackson (born March 22, 1955) is a former professional American football linebacker in the National Football League. He played seven seasons for the Kansas City Chiefs (1978–1984) and two seasons for the New York Jets (1985–1986).

References

1955 births
Living people
Players of American football from Los Angeles
American football linebackers
Washington Huskies football players
Kansas City Chiefs players
New York Jets players